is a Japanese cricketer who played five Women's One Day Internationals in 2003. She was born at Tokyo in 1983.

At the 2010 Asian Games, Kuribayashi led Japan to a bronze medal, beating China by 7 wickets.

References

External links
 

1983 births
Living people
Japanese women cricketers
Asian Games medalists in cricket
Cricketers at the 2010 Asian Games
Cricketers at the 2014 Asian Games
Medalists at the 2010 Asian Games
Asian Games bronze medalists for Japan
Wicket-keepers